Musicology Live 2004ever was a concert tour by American recording artist Prince to promote his Musicology album. The tour began on March 27, 2004 in Reno, Nevada and concluded on September 11 in San Jose, California. It was a commercial success earning $87.4 million from 77 shows in 52 cities across the United States and selling more than 1.4 million tickets. Prince said one of the goals of the tour was "to bring back music and live musicianship."

Background and development 
In April 2004, Prince released his thirtieth studio album Musicology from Columbia Records after leaving former record labels Warner Bros. and Arista. The album followed the 2003 releases Xpectation and N.E.W.S. When speaking about the album, Prince stated: 
"I am really an artist and a musician at heart, that's what I do. Musicology has no boundaries or formats. It is long overdue to return to the art and craft of music, that's what this album is about. School's in session."

The singer gave a small performance at the El Rey Theater in Los Angeles in February to preview some of the new songs from the album where he also announced plans for an upcoming tour. Tour dates were announced later that month in North America. He opened the 2004 Grammy Awards with Beyoncé and was also inducted into the Rock and Roll Hall of Fame the same year. More tour dates were announced shortly afterward.

The Musicology Tour also increased sales of the Musicology album because concertgoers received a copy of Musicology, with the album cost included in the ticket price for the tour. This prompted Billboard magazine and Nielsen SoundScan to change its chart data methodology: For future album releases, Billboard says that customers "must be given an option to either add the CD to the ticket purchase or forgo the CD for a reduced ticket-only price."

Set list
This set list is representative of the first show in Los Angeles on March 29, 2004. It does not represent all concerts during the tour.

 "Musicology"
 "Let's Go Crazy" 
 "I Would Die 4 U"
 "When Doves Cry" 
 "Baby I'm a Star"
 "Shhh"
 "D.M.S.R."
 "I Feel for You" 
 "Controversy"
 "God"
 "The Beautiful Ones"
 "Nothing Compares 2 U"
 "Insatiable"
 "Sign 'O' the Times"
 "The Question of U"
 "Let's Work"
 "U Got the Look"
 "Life O' the Party"
 "Soul Man" 
 "Kiss"
 "Take Me with U"
 "4ever in My Life"
 "12:01"
 "On the Couch"
 "Little Red Corvette"
 "Sometimes It Snows in April" 
 "7"
 "Purple Rain"

Shows

Band

 Lead vocals & guitar – Prince
 Rhythm guitar – Mike Scott
 Bass – Rhonda Smith 
 Drums – John Blackwell
 Keyboards – Renato Neto and Rad 
 Saxophones – Maceo Parker and Candy Dulfer
 Trombone – Greg Boyer
 Keys — Chance Howard

Source:

Notes

References 

Prince (musician) concert tours
2004 concert tours